Mount Overrocker, also known as Mount Rouge, is a mountain range located in Adirondack Mountains of New York located in the Town of Wells north-northwest of the hamlet of Wells.

References

Mountains of Hamilton County, New York
Mountains of New York (state)